Bird sanctuaries are nature facilities that advocate the conservation of various species of birds and their natural habitats while promoting rehabilitation and survival

List of bird sanctuaries of India

References